Leo Velho Mauricio (7 May 1934 – 18 July 2010) was an Indian politician and lawyer from Goa. He was a former member of the Goa Legislative Assembly, representing the Navelim Assembly constituency from 1967 to 1980. He was also a member of the Azad Gomantak Dal.

Early and personal life
Leo Velho Mauricio was born in Chinchinim, Goa. He was a practising Roman Catholic and was married to Rica Fernandes. Mauricio completed his S.S.C at St. Stanislaus High School at Bombay (now Mumbai). He later completed his graduation in Bachelor of Arts from R.P.D. College at Belgaum (Karnataka University). 

Mauricio went on to get a Masters of Arts degree from St. Xavier’s College, Bombay. He was employed as a Bar-at-law at the Honourable Society of Lincoln's Inn, London. He resided at Chinchinim, Goa.

Notes

References

External links
 Triangular fight between Avertano, Pratima & Valanka in Navelim

1934 births
2010 deaths
Indian politicians
Goan people
People from South Goa district
Goa, Daman and Diu MLAs 1972–1977
Goa MLAs 1977–1980
Goa, Daman and Diu MLAs 1963–1967
20th-century Indian politicians